The Orient Express was a long-distance passenger train service created in 1883 by the Belgian company Compagnie Internationale des Wagons-Lits (CIWL) that operated until 2009. The train traveled the length of continental Europe, with main terminal stations in Paris in the northwest and Istanbul in the southeast, and branches extending service to Athens, Brussels, and London.

The route and rolling stock of the Orient Express changed many times. Several routes in the past concurrently used the Orient Express name, or slight variations. Although the original Orient Express was simply a normal international railway service, the name became synonymous with intrigue and luxury rail travel. The two city names most prominently served and associated with the Orient Express are Paris and Istanbul, the original endpoints of the timetabled service.

In 1977, the Orient Express stopped serving Istanbul. Its immediate successor, a through overnight service from Paris to Bucharest, was later cut back in 1991 to Budapest, and in 2001 was again shortened to Vienna, before departing for the last time from Paris on Friday 8 June 2007. After this, the route, still called the Orient Express, was shortened to start from Strasbourg instead, occasioned by the inauguration of the LGV Est which afforded much shorter travel times from Paris to Strasbourg. The new curtailed service left Strasbourg at 22:20 daily, shortly after the arrival of a TGV from Paris, and was attached at Karlsruhe to the overnight sleeper service from Amsterdam to Vienna. On 14 December 2009, the Orient Express ceased to operate and the route disappeared from European railway timetables, reportedly a "victim of high-speed trains and cut-rate airlines". 

Since 13 December 2021, an ÖBB Nightjet again runs three times per week on the Paris-Vienna route, although not branded as Orient Express. The Venice-Simplon Orient Express train, a private venture by Belmond using original CIWL carriages from the 1920s and 1930s, continues to run to and from various destinations in Europe, including the original route from Paris to Istanbul.

Train Eclair de luxe (the "test" train) 

The train left Paris Gare de l'Est on Tuesday, 10 October 1882, just after 18:30 and arrived in Vienna the next day at 23:20. The return trip left Vienna on Friday, 13 October at 16:40 and, as planned, re-entered the Gare de Strasbourg at 20:00 on Saturday 14 October.

Georges Nagelmackers was the founder of Compagnie Internationale des Wagons-Lits (CIWL), which expanded its luxury trains, travel agencies and hotels all over Europe, Asia, and North Africa. Its most famous train remains the Orient Express.

The train was composed of:
 Baggage car
 Sleeping coach with 16 beds (with bogies)
 Sleeping coach with 14 beds (3 axles)
 Restaurant coach (nr. 107)
 Sleeping coach with 13 beds (3 axles)
 Sleeping coach with 13 beds (3 axles)
 Baggage car (complete 101 ton)
The first menu on board (10 October 1882): oysters, soup with Italian pasta, turbot with green sauce, chicken ‘à la chasseur’, fillet of beef with ‘château’ potatoes, ‘chaud-froid’ of game animals, lettuce, chocolate pudding, buffet of desserts.

Routes

History

On 5 June 1883, the first Express d'Orient left Paris for Vienna via Munich. Vienna remained the terminus until 4 October 1883, when the route was extended to Giurgiu, Romania. At Giurgiu, passengers were ferried across the Danube to Ruse, Bulgaria, to pick up another train to Varna. They then completed their journey to Constantinople, as the city was still commonly called in the west at the time, by ferry. In 1885, another route began operations, this time reaching Constantinople via rail from Vienna to Belgrade and Niš, carriage to Plovdiv, and rail again to Istanbul. 

On 1 June 1889, the first direct train to Constantinople left Paris from Gare de l'Est. Istanbul, as it became known in English by the 1930s, remained its easternmost stop until 19 May 1977. The eastern terminus was the Sirkeci Terminal by the Golden Horn. Ferry service from piers next to the terminal would take passengers across the Bosphorus to Haydarpaşa Terminal, the terminus of the Asian lines of the Ottoman Railways.

The train was officially renamed the Orient Express in 1891.

The onset of the First World War in 1914 saw Orient Express services suspended. They resumed at the end of hostilities in 1918, and in 1919 the opening of the Simplon Tunnel allowed the introduction of a more southerly route via Milan, Venice, and Trieste. The service on this route was known as the Simplon Orient Express, and it ran in addition to continuing services on the old route. The Treaty of Saint-Germain contained a clause requiring Austria to accept this train: formerly, Austria allowed international services to pass through Austrian territory (which included Trieste at the time) only if they ran via Vienna. The Simplon Orient Express soon became the most important rail route between Paris and Istanbul.

The 1930s saw the Orient Express services at its most popular, with three parallel services running: the Orient Express, the Simplon Orient Express, and also the Arlberg Orient Express, which ran via the Arlberg railway between Zürich and Innsbruck to Budapest, with sleeper cars running onwards from there to Bucharest and Athens. During this time, the Orient Express acquired its reputation for comfort and luxury, carrying sleeping cars with permanent service and restaurant cars known for the quality of their cuisine. Royalty, nobles, diplomats, business people, and the bourgeoisie in general patronized it. Each of the Orient Express services also incorporated sleeping cars which had run from Calais to Paris, thus extending the service from one end of continental Europe to the other.

The start of the Second World War in 1939 again interrupted the service, which did not resume until 1945. During the war, the German Mitropa company had run some services on the route through the Balkans, but Yugoslav Partisans frequently sabotaged the track, forcing a stop to this service.

Following the end of the war, normal services resumed except on the Athens leg, where the closure of the border between Yugoslavia and Greece prevented services from running. That border re-opened in 1951, but the closure of the Bulgarian–Turkish border from 1951 to 1952 prevented services running to Istanbul during that time. As the Iron Curtain fell across Europe, the service continued to run, but the Communist nations increasingly replaced the Wagon-Lits cars with carriages run by their own railway services.

By 1962, the original Orient Express and Arlberg Orient Express had stopped running, leaving only the Simplon Orient Express. This was replaced in 1962 by a slower service called the Direct Orient Express, which ran daily cars from Paris to Belgrade, and twice weekly services from Paris to Istanbul and Athens.

In 1971, the Wagon-Lits company stopped running carriages itself and making revenues from a ticket supplement. Instead, it sold or leased all its carriages to the various national railway companies, but continued to provide staff for the carriages. 1976 saw the withdrawal of the Paris–Athens direct service, and in 1977, the Direct Orient Express was withdrawn completely, with the last Paris–Istanbul service running on 19 May of that year.

The withdrawal of the Direct Orient Express was thought by many to signal the end of the Orient Express as a whole, but in fact a service under this name continued to run from Paris to Bucharest as before (via Strasbourg, Munich, Vienna, and Budapest). However, a through sleeping car from Paris to Bucharest was only operated until 1982, and also a through seating car was only operated seasonally. This meant that, as Paris–Budapest and Vienna–Bucharest coaches were running overlapped, a journey was only possible with changing carriages – despite the unchanged name and numbering of the train. In 1991 the Budapest-Bucharest leg of the train was discontinued, the new final station now becoming Budapest. In the summer season of 1999 and 2000 a sleeping car from Bucharest to Paris reappeared running twice a week, now operated by CFR. This continued until 2001, when the service was cut back to just Paris–Vienna, as a EuroNight train, though the coaches were actually attached to a regular Paris–Strasbourg express for that leg of the journey. This service continued daily, listed in the timetables under the name Orient Express, until 8 June 2007.

With the opening of the LGV Est Paris–Strasbourg high speed rail line on 10 June 2007, the Orient Express service was further cut back to Strasbourg–Vienna, departing nightly at 22:20 from Strasbourg, and still bearing the name, but lost the train numbers 262/263 which it had borne for decades.

The remains of the original train had a convenient connection to the Strasbourg-Paris TGV, but due to the less flexible prices the route became less attractive. In the final years through coaches between Vienna and Karlsruhe (continuing first to Dortmund, then to Amsterdam, and finally to Frankfurt) were attached. The last train with the name Orient-Express (now with a hyphen) departed from Vienna on 10 December 2009, and one day later from Strasbourg.

On 13 December 2021, an ÖBB Nightjet train began running three times per week on the Paris-Vienna route, although it is not branded as Orient Express.

Privately run trains using the name 
In 1976, the Swiss travel company Intraflug AG first rented, then later bought several CIWL-carriages. They were operated as the Nostalgic Istanbul Orient Express by Seattle-based Society Expeditions. The route went first from Zürich to Istanbul, following the route of the Arlberg Orient Express. In 1983, the 100th anniversary of the Orient Express was celebrated by extending the route to run from Paris to Istanbul. The train ceased operations in 2007.

In 1982, the Venice-Simplon Orient Express was established by businessman James Sherwood as a private venture and is currently owned and operated by Belmond. It operates restored 1920s and 1930s carriages on routes around Europe. It also offers connecting service from London to Folkestone on the British Pullman, using similarly restored vintage British Pullman cars. The Venice-Simplon Orient Express operates from March to December and is aimed at leisure travellers. Tickets start at $3,262 USD per person and it operates on multiple different routes most notably Paris-Istanbul via Vienna and Budapest. Despite its name, the train runs via the Brenner Pass instead of the Simplon tunnel. Belmond also offers a similarly themed luxury train in Singapore, Malaysia and Thailand, called the Eastern and Oriental Express. Sherwood also operated a chain of Orient Express-branded luxury hotels, licensed from SNCF, owner of the Orient Express branding. The chain was renamed Belmond in 2014 when the branding license ended.

In 2017, Accor Hotels bought a 50% stake in the Orient Express brand from SNCF, in order to launch a new chain of luxury Orient Express Hotels. In 2022, Accor and SNCF announced they would relaunch the Orient Express with a Paris–Istanbul service, which will start in 2025. Another service called Orient Express La Dolce Vita would be launched with 8 different itineraries around Italy. beginning in 2024. The Orient Express service will be launched in 2025 from Paris to Istanbul having a stop in Split, Croatia. The train cars on the route will include 17 historic carriages from the defunct Nostalgie Istanbul Orient Express, which were discovered by French railway historian Arthur Mettetal in 2015 at the Małaszewicze train station at the Poland–Belarus border. In 2018, the cars were transported to France, for renovation work designed by Maxime d'Angeac.

In popular culture 
The glamour and rich history of the Orient Express has frequently lent itself to the plot of books and films and as the subject of television documentaries.

Literature
Dracula (1897) by Bram Stoker: while Count Dracula escapes from England to Varna by sea, the group sworn to destroy him travels to Paris and takes the Orient Express, arriving in Varna ahead of him.
 Gentlemen Prefer Blondes (1925) by Anita Loos wherein Lorelei and her friend Dorothy take a journey on the "Oriental" express from Paris to Central Europe.
 Stamboul Train (1932) by Graham Greene
 The short story "Have You Got Everything You Want?" (1933), by Agatha Christie
Murder on the Orient Express (1934), one of the most famous works by Agatha Christie, takes place on the Simplon Orient Express
Oriënt-Express (1934) a novel by A. den Doolaard: it takes place in North Macedonia.
 From Russia, with Love (1957), a James Bond novel by Ian Fleming, sees Bond travel from Istanbul to Venice aboard the Simplon Orient Express.
 Travels with My Aunt (1969) by Graham Greene
 Paul Theroux (1975) devotes a chapter of The Great Railway Bazaar to his journey from Paris to Istanbul on the Direct-Orient Express.
 Neither Here nor There: Travels in Europe (1991) by Bill Bryson describes riding the train in 1973, when it was a run-down and neglected route. 
 The Orient Express (1992) a novel by Gregor von Rezzori follows a European American who, having ridden the original Orient Express in his youth, returns late in life to ride the refurbished version.
 Flashman and the Tiger (1999) by George MacDonald Fraser: Harry Paget Flashman travels on the train's first journey as a guest of the journalist Henri Blowitz.
 The Orient Express appeared in the 2004 novel Lionboy and its sequel Lionboy: The Case by Zizou Corder. Charlie Ashanti was stowing away on the train on his way to Venice when he met King Boris of Bulgaria.
 The short story "On the Orient, North" by Ray Bradbury
 The Orient Express appeared as a technologically advanced (for its time) train in the book Behemoth, by Scott Westerfeld.
Thea Stilton and the Mystery on the Orient Express by Elisabetta Dami
Madness on the Orient Express is an anthology of horror stories, all connected to the Orient Express, edited by James Lowder.
 First Class Murder (2015) by Robin Stevens from the Murder Most Unladylike series is set on the Orient Express.

The Oriënt-Express served as the venue for a chess game described in the (1997) novel The Lüneburg Variation by Paolo Maurensig.

Film
 Orient Express (1934), film adaptation of Graham Greene's Stamboul Train.
 Orient Express (1944), German film about a murder on the train.
 Sleeping Car to Trieste (1948), film by the Rank Organisation, story by Clifford Grey. A stolen diplomatic document is the quest of various groups on the Orient Express from Paris to Trieste.  Copyright by Two Cities Films Ltd.
 Orient Express (1954), whose plot revolves around a two-day stop at a village in the Alps by passengers on the Orient Express.
 From Russia with Love (1963): James Bond, along with Bond girl Tatiana Romanova and ally Ali Kerim Bey, tries to travel on the Orient Express from Istanbul to Trieste, but complications involving SPECTRE assassin Red Grant force Bond and Tatiana to jump off the train in Yugoslav Istria.
  (1968): thriller, made for television, starring Gene Barry.
 Travels with My Aunt (1972): Henry Pulling accompanies his aunt, Augusta Bertram, on a trip from London to Turkey. The two board the Orient Express in Paris; the train takes them to Turkey (though they disembark briefly at the Milan stop).
 The Agatha Christie novel has been adapted into films in 1974, 2001, and 2017
 Romance on the Orient Express (1985): TV movie with Cheryl Ladd.
 102 Dalmatians (2000)
 Death, Deceit and Destiny Aboard the Orient Express (2000)
 Around the World in 80 Days (2004): Mr Fogg travels on the train to Istanbul.
 Orient Express (2004)
 Murder Mystery (2019): In the final scene Nick and Audrey Spitz are travelling on the Orient Express.

Television
 Orient Express was a syndicated TV series in the early- to mid-1950s.  Filmed in Europe, its half-hour dramas featured such stars as Paul Lukas, Jean-Pierre Aumont, Geraldine Brooks and Erich von Stroheim.
 In "The Orient Express" (episode number 48 of The World of Commander McBragg cartoon series), the Commander tells the story of how he once rode on that fabled train, dodging several assassination attempts on his life en route.
In the Pink Panther cartoon "Pinkfinger" the Pink Panther tries to be a secret agent and is almost blown up by a bomb on the Orient Express.
 Daylight Robbery on the Orient Express, an episode of the award-winning British comedy television series The Goodies, was first broadcast on 5 October 1976 and is partially set aboard the train.
 Mystery on the Orient Express: a television special featuring illusionist David Copperfield. During the special, Copperfield rode aboard the train and, at its conclusion, made the dining car seemingly disappear.
 "The Istambul Train", "Il treno d'Istanbul" (1980) Hungarian–Italian television series "Stamboul Train" original title by Graham Greene (1932).
 "Minder on the Orient Express" (1985): a special episode of the long-running ITV sit-com Minder.
 Whicker's World – Aboard The Orient Express: Travel journalist Alan Whicker joined the inaugural service of the Venice-Simplon Orient Express to Venice in 1982, interviewing invited guests and celebrities along the way.
 Gavin Stamp's Orient Express: in 2007 UK's Five broadcast an arts/travel series which saw the historian journey from Paris to Istanbul along the old Orient Express route.
 The 1987 cartoon Teenage Mutant Ninja Turtles had an episode titled "Turtles on the Orient Express". As the title suggests it is primarily based on the train.
 A 1993 advert for Bisto Fuller Flavour Gravy Granules featured in it with a young couple. 
 The 1995 cartoon Madeline had an episode titled Madeline on the Orient Express, in which a chef stole a snake.
 The episode "Emergence" of the science fiction television series Star Trek: The Next Generation partially takes place on a Holodeck representation of the Orient Express.
 On 15 May 2007 broadcast of Jeopardy!, the shows theme music "Think" was played by a person on the train's piano, since the Final Jeopardy clue was about the Orient Express.
 In the British soap opera EastEnders, in 1986, characters Den and Angie Watts spent their honeymoon on the train.
 "Aboard the Orient Express" Get Smart series 1, episode 13 is set on the Orient Express.
 In one episode of the British cartoon series Danger Mouse, called "Danger Mouse on the Orient Express" (a parody of Murder on the Orient Express), Danger Mouse and Penfold travel on the train on their way back to London from Venice. Danger Mouse's arch enemy Greenback is also on the train.
 In an episode of the television series Chuck, Chuck and Sarah decide to go AWOL and take a trip on the Orient Express.
 At the end of the Doctor Who episode "The Big Bang", the Doctor receives a call for help from the "Orient Express — in space". This setting is used in the episode "Mummy on the Orient Express", including a reference to the ending of "The Big Bang", four years later.
 In episode 15 of television series Forever (U.S. TV series), Dr Henry Morgan travelled from Budapest to Istanbul with his wife Abigail Morgan on his honeymoon in 1955. He performed an appendectomy on a member of the fictional Urkesh royalty.
 The Backyardigans episode "Le Master of Disguise" features the Orient Express, showing Uniqua, Pablo, Austin, Tasha and Tyrone going to Istanbul from Paris.
 The series Agatha Christie's Poirot, which adapted the entirety of Christie's works featuring Hercule Poirot as played by David Suchet, included an adaptation of Murder on the Orient Express as part of its 2010 episodes.
 Michael Palin's Around The World in Eighty Days (1988). Michael Palin travelled on the Orient Express in episode 1 from London Victoria to Innsbruck, using a ferry across the English Channel from Folkestone. The train did not continue on to Venice because of a strike on the Italian railways.

Music
 Alex Otterlei’s  "Horror on the Orient Express" is inspired by the Call of Cthulhu RPG. The integral symphonic version was released on CD in 2002, a 26-minute Suite for Concert Band was published in 2012.
 Orient Expressions, a musical group from Turkey who combine traditional Turkish music with elements of electronica, take their name from the train service.
 The Jean Michel Jarre album The Concerts in China has a track entitled "Orient Express" as track 1 of disc 2, though the relation to the train is unknown.
 A concert band piece, Orient Express is written by Philip Sparke.
 There was a band based in Hawaii called Liz Damon's Orient Express.

Video games
Sources:
 The role-playing game Call of Cthulhu (1981) used the train for one of its more famous campaigns, Horror on the Orient Express.
 The TSR role-playing game Top Secret had a 1983 module based on the train titled "Operation Orient Express".
 Just Games released a murder mystery boardgame (1985) called Orient Express using the famous train route as a backdrop for solving murders. The game is based on the novel Murder on the Orient Express by Agatha Christie.
 Heart of China (1991 computer game) has a final sequence in the Orient Express. An action scene takes place on the roof.
 In 1994's season 1 episode of Where on Earth Is Carmen Sandiego? called, "The Gold Old Bad Days", Carmen Sandiego and her V.I.L.E. gang are given a challenge to do something low tech by The Player robbery. Carmen's goal is the train.
 The Orient Express plays host to an adventure game by Jordan Mechner. The Last Express (1997 computer game) is a murder mystery game set around the last ride of the Orient Express before it suspended operations at the start of World War I. Robert Cath, an American doctor wanted by French police as he is suspected of the murder of an Irish police officer, becomes involved in a maelstrom of treachery, lies, political conspiracies, personal interests, romance and murder. The game has 30 characters representing a cross-section of European forces at the time.
 In the game Crash Bandicoot 3: Warped (1998) for PS1, the third level (which is Asian-themed) is named Orient Express.
 The Orient Express was featured in two scenarios in the Railroad Tycoon series:
 In Railroad Tycoon II (1998), players get to connect Paris to Constantinople in a territory buying challenge.
 In Railroad Tycoon 3 (2003) players need to connect Vienna to Istanbul.
 The train is featured in Microsoft Train Simulator (2001), where its route is a  section from Innsbruck to Sankt Anton am Arlberg in Austria.
 The Orient Express cars were made available for download to use in Auran's Trainz Railroad Simulator 2004 or later versions by the content creation group FMA.
 The video game adaptation of From Russia With Love includes scenes aboard the Orient Express
 The Adventure Company developed a point-and-click adventure based on Agatha Christie's novel, Agatha Christie: Murder on the Orient Express (2006).
 The first scenes of The Raven: Legacy of a Master Thief, a 2013 game for PC, involve a mystery set amongst train carriages inspired by the Orient Express.
 The entire Orient Express set was used in the Facebook game, TrainStation (2010).
 The Orient Express is a usable engine and caboose in the mobile game Tiny Rails (2016).
In Euro Truck Simulator 2 (2012) there is an achievement called Orient Express requiring players to complete deliveries between the following cities: Paris-Strasbourg, Strasbourg-Munich, Munich-Vienna, Vienna-Budapest, Budapest-Bucharest, Bucharest-Istanbul.
In Train Simulator (video game), it features several routes of the Arlberg-Orient Express from London to Faversham, Bludenz to Innsbruck, a few lines around Salzburg, and a small section of the Simplon-Orient Express in Ljubljana. It also features a part of the ÖBB EN Orient Express and the original Orient Express line between Strasbourg and Munich.

See also
 Lists of named passenger trains
 Orient-Express Hotels
 The Last Express
 Taurus Express
 List of train songs

References

Notes

Bibliography

Further reading
 Orient Express: The Life and Times of the World's Most Famous Train by E H Cookridge.Detail from a copy of the first publication of the book with black and white plates by Allen Lane London in 1979

External links

 Orient-Express, a luxury brand

 
1883 establishments in Europe
2009 disestablishments in Europe
International named passenger trains
Night trains
Railway services introduced in 1883
Railway services discontinued in 2009